Kheyrabad (also Romanized as Kheyrābād; also known as Kheyrābād-e Kūhcheh) is a village in Golestan Rural District, in the Central District of Falavarjan County, Isfahan Province, Iran. At the 2006 census, its population was 767, in 209 families.

References 

Populated places in Falavarjan County